Jackson's spurfowl or Jackson's francolin (Pternistis jacksoni) is a species of bird in the family Phasianidae. It is found in Kenya and Uganda. Its preferred habitats include mountainous forests and stands of bamboo.

The species is named after the English administrator and ornithologist Frederick John Jackson who collected the first specimens.

Taxonomy
Jackson's francolin was described in 1891 by the Scottish ornithologist William Robert Ogilvie-Grant from specimens collected by Frederick John Jackson in Kikuyu, Kenya. Ogilvie-Grant honoured Jackson and coined the binomial name Francolinus jacksoni. The species is now placed in the genus Pternistis that was introduced by the German naturalist Johann Georg Wagler in 1832. Jackson's spurfowl is monotypic: no subspecies are recognised.

References

External links
Xeno-canto: audio recordings of Jackson's spurfowl
Image at ADW

Jackson's spurfowl
Birds of East Africa
Taxa named by William Robert Ogilvie-Grant
Jackson's spurfowl
Taxonomy articles created by Polbot